The Israeli Intelligence Corps (Heil HaModi'in), abbreviated to Haman is an Israel Defense Forces corps which falls under the jurisdiction of IDF Directorate of Military Intelligence (Aman) and is responsible for collecting, disseminating, and publishing intelligence information for the General Staff and the political branch.

History
The corps was established as a result of the Agranat Commission's recommendation on the intelligence shortcomings in the Yom Kippur War. A Chief Intelligence Officer is detached from but subordinate to the head of Aman. On November 12, 1976, its first Chief Intelligence Officer, Brigadier-General Dov Tamari, was appointed.

The corps includes Unit 8200, which is the IDF central collection unit, responsible for SIGINT collection and cryptographical analysis, including the Hatzav Unit, responsible for collecting OSINT intelligence.

The corps also engages in counter-intelligence and information security work, and presents general assessments. The primary and fundamental mission of the military corps is to provide the political and military echelon intelligential warning in real time of war and activity against Israel.

References

External links 
 Intelligence Corps website 

Corps of Israel
Nationstate regiments/corps of military intelligence
Israeli intelligence agencies
Military Intelligence Directorate (Israel)